Reality of Wrestling (ROW) is an independent professional wrestling promotion based in Houston, Texas. It was established as Pro Wrestling Alliance (PWA) in 2005 by WWE Hall of Famer Booker T.

History

Pro Wrestling Alliance
The Pro Wrestling Alliance's first show was held in December 2006. Owner Booker T started the promotion to give professional wrestlers the opportunity to properly train, as well as to keep the legacy of Paul Boesch's Houston Wrestling alive. The money made at shows is donated to Fights For Kids Foundation, which helps kids stay off the streets and shows them the benefits of a better life.

Monthly events were held at the Pasadena Convention Center in Pasadena, Texas, and later at the Clear Lake Recreation Sports Center in Clear Lake, Texas.

In December 2007, Rob Van Dam wrestled his first match after leaving WWE against Booker T for the PWA, and the match is included on the DVD The Best of RVD TV Vol 1 DVD in the extras.

Reality of Wrestling
On March 9, 2012, after seven years as the Pro Wrestling Alliance, the promotion was re-launched as Reality of Wrestling (ROW) and began holding events at the Booker T World Gym Arena in Texas City, Texas. The name change was a spontaneous decision of Booker T. In December 2012, the promotion almost closed with Christmas Chaos planned as the last show. However, last minute investors and partners helped the promotion continue to run.

The promotion produces a weekly YouTube show with tapings taking place once monthly at their live events in Clear Lake. ROW later launched a local television program in Houston, Texas that originally aired on KUBE-TV Channel 57 and currently airs on Sunday mornings on KIAH-TV Channel 39. In February 2014, ROW partnered with the Soul of the South Network to air the show in 20 cities. They aired their first internet pay-per-view in July 2014. Episodes are aired on the website FITE TV.

The promotion also includes a school that has a two-year training program for beginning professional wrestlers, as opposed to the more traditional three and six month programs at other schools.

On July 6, 2019, Reality of Wrestling and Impact Wrestling co-produced an event together called Deep Impact that aired live on YouTube and Twitch.

On October 20, 2021, it was announced that Reality of Wrestling would hold the promotions first event outside of Texas called One Night in Vegas in Las Vegas, Nevada on November 19, 2021 at the MGM Grand Garden Arena.

Current champions

See also

List of professional wrestling television series

References

External links
ROW Homepage
ROW Champions History

Reality of Wrestling
2005 establishments in Texas
American professional wrestling promotions
American independent professional wrestling promotions
Companies based in Texas
American companies established in 2005
Entertainment companies established in 2005
Professional wrestling in Texas
American professional wrestling television series
Independent professional wrestling promotions based in Texas